is a Japanese actor. He played Sanosuke Sagara in the live action adaptation of the manga and anime series  Rurouni Kenshin. He is married to Japanese actress and model Yūka.

Filmography

Film
Battle Royale II (2003)
Fly, Daddy, Fly (2005)
Limit of Love: Umizaru (2006)
Hatsukoi (2006)
Heavenly Forest Tada,2006)
Tsubakiyama Kacho no Nanoka-kan (2006)
Tokyo Rhapsody (2007)
Season of Snow (2008)
Oppai Volleyball(2009)
Counterfeit (2009)
Rise Up (2009)
Time Traveller: The Girl Who Leapt Through Time(2010)
Cannonball Wedlock(2011)
My Back Page (2011)
Hara-Kiri: Death of a Samurai (2011)
Rurouni Kenshin (2012), Sanosuke Sagara
Fly With The Gold (2012)
Princess Sakura: Forbidden Pleasures (2013)
Rurouni Kenshin: Kyoto Inferno (2014), Sanosuke Sagara
Rurouni Kenshin: The Legend Ends (2014), Sanosuke Sagara
S The Last Policeman - Recovery of Our Future (2015)
Twisted Justice (2016)
Snow Woman (2016)
Silence (2016)
My Friend "A" (2018)
Mori, The Artist's Habitat (2018)
Our Departures (2018)
It Comes (2018)
Samurai Marathon (2019)
True Mothers (2020)
Ora, Ora Be Goin' Alone (2020)
Independence of Japan (2020)
Rurouni Kenshin: The Final (2021), Sanosuke Sagara
Hokusai (2021), Takai Kōzan
Kawa no Nagare ni (2021)
99.9 Criminal Lawyer: The Movie (2021), Takahisa Marukawa
 The Roundup: No Way Out (TBA)

TV drama series
Umizaru (Fuji TV / 2005) ep.1
H2 (TBS / 2005)
Chiritotechin (NHK / 2007)
Clear Skies, no Incidents (TBS / 2009)
Buzzer Beat (Fuji TV / 2009)
Ryōmaden (NHK / 2010), Gotō Shōjirō
Job Termination Interview (NHK /2010)
The Japanese The Japanese Don't Know (NTV / 2010)
Hatsukoi (NHK / 2012)
Taira no Kiyomori (NHK / 2012), Benkei
Meoto Zenzai (NHK / 2013)
Doubles - Futari no Keiji (TV Asahi / 2013)
Border (TV Asahi / 2014), Tachibana Yuma
Ishi no Mayu (Wowow / 2015), Hideaki Takano
Chikaemon (NHK / 2016), Mankichi
Pretty Proofreader (NTV / 2016), Hachirō Kaizuka
Segodon (NHK / 2018), Shimazu Hisamitsu
North Light (NHK / 2020)
The 13 Lords of the Shogun (NHK / 2022), Kiso Yoshinaka
Futari no Ultraman (NHK / 2022), Hajime Tsuburaya

References

External links
 Official profile 
 

Japanese male film actors
1980 births
Japanese male television actors
Living people
People from Osaka Prefecture
Male actors from Osaka Prefecture
21st-century Japanese male actors